Ixiolirion is a genus of flowering plants native to central and southwest Asia, first described as a genus in 1821. Recent classifications place the group in the monogeneric family Ixioliriaceae in the order Asparagales of the monocots. In earlier systems of classification, it was usually placed in the family Amaryllidaceae.

There are four species in this genus and family
 Ixiolirion ferganicum Kovalevsk. & Vved. - Kyrgyzstan
 Ixiolirion karateginum Lipsky - Pakistan, Tajikistan
 Ixiolirion songaricum P.Yan - Xinjiang
 Ixiolirion tataricum (Pall.) Schult. & Schult.f. - Altai Krai, Kazakhstan, Kyrgyzstan, Tajikistan, Turkmenistan, Uzbekistan, Afghanistan, Pakistan, Iran, Iraq, Syria, Palestine, Sinai, Saudi Arabia, Kuwait, Oman, Persian Gulf sheikdoms, Kashmir, Xinjiang

References

External links 
 Ixioliriaceae in L. Watson and M.J. Dallwitz (1992 onwards). The families of flowering plants: descriptions, illustrations, identification, information retrieval. Version: 27 April 2006. http://delta-intkey.com 
 NCBI Taxonomy Browser
 links at CSDL, Texas

Asparagales genera
Ixioliriaceae